The white-capped dipper (Cinclus leucocephalus) is an aquatic passerine found in South America. It is a small black bird with white spots. It is found in the Andes from northern Bolivia, through Peru, Ecuador, Colombia to northwest Venezuela.

Taxonomy
The white-capped dipper was described by the Swiss naturalist Johann Jakob von Tschudi in 1844 and given the binomial name Cinclus leucocephalus. The type locality is the Junín Province in Peru. The specific epithet leucocephalus combines the Ancient Greek leukos "white" and -kephalos "-headed". Of the five species now placed in the genus, a molecular genetic study has shown that the white-capped dipper is most closely related to the other South American species, the rufous-throated dipper (Cinclus schulzii).

There are three subspecies:
 C. l. rivularis Bangs, 1899 – north Colombia
 C. l. leuconotus Sclater, PL, 1858 – west Venezuela to Ecuador
 C. l. leucocephalus Tschudi, 1844 – Peru and Bolivia

Description
The sexes are similar in appearance, but the male is slightly larger than the female. The nominate subspecies has a white nape and crown with fine dark brown streaks. The remaining upperparts are dark brown. The throat is white; the remaining underparts are dark brown. The bill is black and the legs are dark grey. Subspecies rivularis is paler than the nominate and has fine grey spots on the throat. Subspecies leuconotus has a white belly and a large white patch on the upper back.

References

External links
 
 Bird Forum page on White-capped Dipper (including photo)

white-capped dipper
Birds of the Northern Andes
white-capped dipper